Lupce "Lou" Acevski (born 14 November 1977) is an Australian former soccer goalkeeper who later became a coach. As a player, he played 71 times in the Australian National Soccer League (NSL) for Melbourne Knights, Northern Spirit and Adelaide City. He had a short stint in Czech football where he played seven times for FK SIAD Most. He also made over 200 senior appearances in the Victorian Premier League. Lupce was coach of Hume City FC in the National Premier Leagues Victoria, but left on 21 July 2016. He now works as head coach of Preston Lions.

Notes

External links
 Acevski, Lupce at Australian Player Database
Lupce Acevski at Aussie Footballers

1977 births
Living people
Australian soccer players
Australian expatriate soccer players
Australian people of Macedonian descent
National Soccer League (Australia) players
Melbourne Knights FC players
Czech First League players
FK Baník Most players
Hume City FC players
Melbourne Victory FC players
Expatriate footballers in the Czech Republic
Association football goalkeepers
Australian Macedonian soccer managers
Preston Lions FC managers
Soccer players from Melbourne
Australian expatriate sportspeople in the Czech Republic